Malkasten (English: "Paintbox") is a progressive German artists' association, founded in Düsseldorf in 1848, during the March Revolution. Since 1867, their headquarters have been in the Pempelfort district.

History 
During the unrest in 1848, artists also began to take part in political discussions. In August of that year, the  held an event called the "Fest der Deutschen Einheit" (Festival for German Unity). Many artists and sculptors associated with the Düsseldorfer Malerschule took part in its artistic design. On the night of the celebration, they decided to establish an artist's association which, a few days later, they named "Malkasten", at the suggestion of Karl Hübner. The name was meant to express the equality of every "color"; artistic and political.

The 112 founding members included not only academic professors, such as Theodor Hildebrandt, Heinrich Mücke and Karl Ferdinand Sohn, but also Lorenz Clasen, the editor of the satirical journal , as well as many members of the Malerschule; including Johann Peter Hasenclever, Joseph Fay, Johann Wilhelm Preyer, Peter Schwingen and the German-born American painter,  Emanuel Leutze, who played a key role in developing an art community that was independent of the academies. Although women became active in the organization well before the end of the 19th century, they were not admitted as members until 1977.

Early years 
Within a few weeks, the organization's statutes had been established, and the first Board of Directors elected. In the statutes it was stipulated that the KVM, as an "association for a sociable artistic life", should represent a heterogeneous membership and "has no other purpose than to discuss and promote the interests of art and artists, and to entertain each other socially". As early as 1849, the board was able to officially announce that almost all of Düsseldorf's male artists had joined the association. Following the decision that non-artists could join, it became a focal point for Düsseldorf's intellectual community. The composer, Robert Schumann, was admitted as a member in 1850. The public at large was able to participate in some of the group's activities, through events such as a masked ball and carnival, known as the Malkasten-Redoute, which was celebrated every year until 1938.

In 1856, a group of members associated with Leutze and Hermann Becker, called for a "first gathering" of German visual artists in Bingen am Rhein.

As the association grew, it became impractical to hold meetings and events in rented venues, which were often too small or too expensive. From 1857, efforts were made to acquire land on which to build a permanent meeting hall and administrative offices. They eventually focused their attention on a parcel near Schloss Jägerhof, which was the former residence of the philosopher, Friedrich Heinrich Jacobi. The City of Düsseldorf wanted to keep it from falling into the hands of speculators so, in 1861, they approved Malkasten's request to incorporate and acquire the property.

The Malkasten-Haus, from 1867 

To finance the acquisition, the corporation's Chairman, organized a lottery. The artists provided oil paintings (in gilded frames), watercolors, lithographs, prints and photographs, as well as a marble statue; with a total value of 46,000 Thalers. Construction on the new clubhouse began in 1864, and the building was dedicated in 1867. The garden pond was decorated with a statue modeled after the "Venus de Milo", made of the metal from melted paint tubes. Due to its relatively soft texture, the statue's buttocks became the target of people with crossbows, slings and blowguns.
 
In September 1877, Emperor Wilhelm I was the guest of honor for the presentation of several tableaux vivants; one of which depicted General Gebhard Leberecht von Blücher, crossing the Rhine near Kaub, with Prussian and Russian forces, thereby initiating the campaign in north-east France (1814). This was followed by a banquet. The event made such an impression on the public officials of Düsseldorf that a mural of it was painted in the meeting room of the new  in 1894. 

In the early 1880s, the Rittmeister, and his wife, became acquainted with the magistrate, Emil Hartwich, at a Malkasten event. The subsequent love affair between Elisabeth and Emil led to a duel in which he was killed. This incident served as inspiration for the classic novel, Effi Briest, by Theodor Fontane.

Three years later, they presented one of the last festivals honoring the artist, Albrecht Dürer. Throughout the 1920s, they presented lectures by notable writers, including Thomas Mann.

Many Malkasten artists were persecuted during the Gleichschaltung (Nazification) of Germany, but the officials of the organization itself came to terms with the situation. Together with the Militant League for German Culture, they celebrated the "Nationale Erhebung" (National Uprising) and planted a "" dedicated to "Our Savior in Dire Straits"

The membership structure itself remained unchanged until 1939, following the outbreak of World War II. Up to then, the number of members was steady at around 400. Although some sacrifices had to be made, the strong sense of community enabled them to survive the Great Depression and the Nazi regime. Hentrich served as the first Chairman of the revived organization, from 1945 to 1955.

In 1977,  was the first woman to be accepted as a full member of Malkasten.

The present 

Since 1992, efforts have been made to open the premises and engage with the wider public. The "Jacobihaus" contains lounges and an archive, while the "Hentrichhaus" offers a theater, artist cellar, restaurant and bar. The surrounding park, now known as Malkastenpark, has had a biergarten since 2014.

According to the minutes of the general meeting in April, 2019, the organization currently has 302 regular members (mostly artists); down from 403 in 2002, when the last official list was published, but up from 280 in 2018. In addition, there are approximately 170 "extraordinary" members (friends and sponsors), and five honorary members.

Malkasten has four organizational units: the Künstlerverein (artists' association), the affiliated Weinkellerei Malkasten GmbH (wine cellar), their bar, restaurant and catering operations, and the Stiftung Malkasten (Malkasten foundation). The catering service has been suspended since 2014. The foundation has been officially recognized as a non-profit organization since 2012. Its aim is to support the association in maintaining its historic buildings, as well as the park, and preserve its independence.

The association's board organizes ongoing exhibitions, artist talks, concerts, film screenings, lectures and other cultural events in the buildings and in the park. Access to the events is open to all interested parties, mostly free of charge or at a low price.

Honorary members (a selection) 

 1850: Anton Fahne
 1850: Ferdinand Freiligrath
 Karl Anton, Prince of Hohenzollern
 1857: Adolph Schroedter
 1874: Otto von Bismarck
 1885: Adolph von Menzel
 1886: Andreas Achenbach
 1888: Helmuth Liesegang
 1897: Oswald Achenbach
 1898: Ludwig Knaus
 1917: Erich Ludendorff, Paul von Hindenburg
 1946: Paul Clemen
 1947: 
 Theodor Heuss
 1954: 
 1970: 
 1990: 
 1998: Klaus Rinke
 2003:

References

Further reading 
 Ernst von Schaumburg: Jacobi’s Garten zu Pempelfort: ein historischer Beitrag zur Feier des 25-jährigen Jubiläums des Künstler-Vereins ‚Malkasten‘; nebst einem Plan des Gartens. Jacobi, Aachen 1873, (Online) @ the ULB Düsseldorf
 Eduard Daelen: Aus der Geschichte des Künstlervereins Malkasten: zur Jubelfeier seines fünfzigjährigen Bestehens. 1848–1898. Düsseldorf 1898
 Carl Murdfield: "Aus der Chronika des Malkasten". In Velhagen & Klasings Monatshefte, #42, 1927/1928, Vol.1, ; (Online) @ Goethezeit
Landschaftsverband Rheinland, Archives: Quellen zur Geschichte des Künstlervereins Malkasten. Archivheft 24, Rheinland-Verlag Köln, 1992, 
 Wolfgang Hütt: Die Düsseldorfer Malerschule 1819–1869. E. A. Seemann Verlag, Leipzig 1995, 
 Sabine Schroyen (ed.): Hundertfünfzig Jahre Künstlerverein Malkasten. Malkasten Edition. Richter, Düsseldorf 1998,  (Contents)
 Sabine Schroyen: Bildquellen zur Geschichte des Künstlervereins Malkasten in Düsseldorf. Künstler und ihre Werke in den Sammlungen. Grupello Verlag, Düsseldorf 2001,

External links 

 Künstlerverein Malkasten, Homepage
 Zur Geschichte des Künstlervereins Malkasten. (A detailed history)

German artist groups and collectives
Artist cooperatives
Arts organizations
Culture in Düsseldorf
Art societies